Witting is a popular Germanic surname.

Etymology
"Witting" is thought to be a patronymic surname, derive the Old English personal name Hwit, meaning "the white one".

Notable people
 Alexander Witting (1861–1946), German mathematician
 Amy Witting (1918–2001), Australian novelist and poet
 Richard Witting (1856–1923), Prussian politician and financier
 Rolf Witting (1879–1944), Minister of Foreign Affairs (Finland) 1940–1943

References

English-language surnames
German-language surnames